Michael "Mikko" Kozarowitzky (born 17 May 1948) is a former racing driver from Helsinki, Finland. With a solid background in various lower formulae, he reached Formula One in 1977. Driving for the RAM team, which was then running March 761 cars, Kozarowitzky entered the 1977 Swedish Grand Prix where he failed to qualify mainly thanks to a lack of testing time in the car.

Kozarowitsky's next attempt was at the 1977 British Grand Prix where he failed to pre-qualify following an accident avoiding Rupert Keegan during practice. Kozarowitzky broke his hand in the accident and left the team after they wanted him to try to qualify in the spare car despite his injury. His Formula One plans for 1978 came to nothing due to lack of funds, and he then retired from the sport.

Complete Formula One results 
(key)

References

External links 
Biography at F1 Rejects

1948 births
Finnish racing drivers
Finnish Formula One drivers
Living people
Finnish people of Polish descent
Finnish people of Russian descent
RAM Racing Formula One drivers
SCCA Formula Super Vee drivers
Formula Super Vee Champions
Sportspeople from Helsinki

Formel Super Vau drivers